Canzoniere Grecanico Salentino (CGS), formed by writer Rina Durante in 1975, is a traditional music ensemble from Salento, Italy. The seven piece band and dancer perform a contemporary style of Southern Italy's traditional Pizzica music and dance.

According to the group's website, it has performed with musical artists including Ballaké Sissoko, Ibrahim Maalouf, Piers Faccini, composer Ludovico Einaudi, and drummer Stewart Copeland of The Police. CGS opened the Concertone of La Notte della Taranta in Melpignano in front of over 100,000 people.

Based in Lecce, the group performs concerts under the direction of fiddler and drummer Mauro Durante. Durante took over as bandleader from his father, Daniele Durante, in 2007. Previously, Durante was the musical assistant to Einaudi, Maestro Concertatore of the La Notte della Taranta festival.

CGS has recorded 18 albums and performed in the US, Canada, Europe and the Middle East. In 2010, CGS was awarded Best Italian World Music Group at the Meeting of Independent Labels festival in Italy.

In 2015, they released Quaranta (40), an album recorded live-to-tape without overdubs and produced by Ian Brennan.

Band members
 Mauro Durante, frame drums, violin, vocals
 Emanuele Licci, bouzuki, classical guitar, vocals
 Alessia Tondo, vocals
 Silvia Perrone, dance
 Giulio Bianco, harmonica, zampogna (Italian bagpipes), recorder
 Massimiliano Morabito, diatonic accordion
 Giancarlo Paglialunga, tamburello, vocals

Discography
 1977 – Canti di Terra d'Otranto e della Grecia Salentina
 1980 – Concerto 1
 1983 – Come farò a diventare un mito
 1985 – Concerto 2
 1988 – Canzoniere Grecanico Salentino
 1991 – Concerto 3
 1994 – Sutt'acqua e sutta ientu navegamu
 1994 – Mamminieddhu Zuccaratu
 1997 – Ni pizzicau lu core
 1998 – Ballati tutti quanti ballati forte
 2000 – Canti e pizzichi d'amore
 2000 – Carataranta
 2001 – Pizzica pizzica
 2002 – Alla riva del mare
 2002 – Serenata
 2010 – Focu d'amore
 2012 – 
 2015 – Quaranta
 2017 – Canzoniere

Awards and nominations
 2010 – Best Italian World Music Band – MEI's confab
 2011 – Babel Med Music selection
 2012 – globalFEST NYC selection
 2012 – Womex selection
 2013 – SXSW selection
 2013 – Montreal International Jazz Festival selection
 2013 – Womad selection

See also
 Tarantism
 Grecìa Salentina

References
Sito ufficiale Canzoniere Grecanico Salentino
The New York Times about CGS
Womex

External links

Italian folk music groups